Petrov is a rural locality (a khutor) in Gabukayskoye Rural Settlement of Teuchezhsky District, the Republic of Adygea, Russia. The population was 283 as of 2018. There are 4 streets.

Geography 
Petrov is located 17 km northeast of Ponezhukay (the district's administrative centre) by road. Shevchenko is the nearest rural locality.

References 

Rural localities in Teuchezhsky District